"Old Rosin the Beau" (or "Rosin the Bow") is an American folk song popular in the 19th century, probably of British or Irish origin, first published in Philadelphia during 1838.

An earlier version, "Rosin the Bow" (not "Beau") refers to rosin with the bow of a violin, but both cover the same general subject (see below: Full lyrics). There are many variations of the song(s), and the tune has been re-used in other songs for political campaign jingles, slave songs, comedy songs, or other folk songs.

Early versions of "Old Rosin the Beau" relate the story of a man who was popular in his youth, then in late life, the ladies refer to him as "Old Rosin, the beau", as he prepares for the grave.
As a drinking song, the chorus chimes, "Take a drink for Old Rosin the Beau" and uses dark comedy, with jests about his grave or tombstone, taken in stride while repeating the sing-song melody. The song is structured where soloists can sing a verse, and then the group can join the chorus/refrain portion after each verse.

Partial lyrics
The lyrics depend on which version of the song is considered. The 1838 version of "Old Rosin the Beau" begins with the following verse:
The lyrics, as arranged by J. C. Beckell in 1838, are as follows:

The original folk song, "Rosin the Bow" begins as follows:

Early history
Both the tune and early lyrics for "Rosin the Bow" are traditional (with no known author). In 1838, the variation "Old Rosin the Beau" was published as a "Comic Song Dedicated to the Members of the Falcon Club by the Publisher" (Ld. Meignen & Co.), arranged by J. C. Beckell.

Other texts

Several US presidential campaign songs were set to the tune of "Old Rosin the Beau", including for Abraham Lincoln ("Lincoln and Liberty"). William Henry Harrison was the subject of three separate songs set to the tune: "The Hero of Tippecanoe", "Tyler and Tippecanoe",  and another, similar, song by the same name. Henry Clay, Whig candidate in 1824, 1832, and 1844, was the subject of many more, in keeping with the Whig tradition of the time to glorify their candidates in song. George Hood's Henry Clay Minstrel, compiled in 1843, lists six: Harry, The Honest And True; The Ladies' Whig Song; The Whig Rifle Tune; The Saint Louis Clay Club Song; How Many Clay Men Are There, and Come All Ye Good Men Of The Nation.

A 19th-century American hymn by Seymour Boughton Sawyer, "How bright is the day when the Christian", was set to the tune and published as "Sawyer's Exit" in the Sacred Harp edition of 1850, in a three-part arrangement attributed to John Massengale.

The tune has been used in "Acres of Clams" (aka "Old Settler's Song"). It is also the melody to "Down in the Willow Garden" (aka "Rose Connolly"). Randy Sparks later used it for the song "Denver", performed by The New Christy Minstrels on their 1963 live album, The New Christy Minstrels – In Person.

The melody was also used in several Irish rebel songs including "The Boys of Kilmichael", "The Men of the West" and "The Soldiers of Cumann na mBan".

On his album The Irish-American's Song, David Kincaid used the tune as the setting for a Confederate version of "Kelly's Irish Brigade", a song from the American Civil War, earlier set to "Columbia, Gem of the Ocean".

Full lyrics
The full lyrics for one version of "Rosin the Bow" develop into dark comedy.

References

External links

Bluegrass songs
American folk songs
Drinking songs
19th-century songs
Year of song unknown